The Valdivian soft coral (Parasphaerasclera valdiviae) is a species of colonial leathery or soft coral in the family Alcyoniidae.

Description
Valdivian soft corals grow in small colonies of between 1 and 11 cm in height and up to 10 cm in diameter. The colony has stubby branches extending from a conspicuous short thick trunk. The polyps are white, but the colony colour is variable from white to pink to orange or even red. Some colonies may be bi-coloured.

Distribution
This species is known from the Cape Peninsula to northern KwaZulu-Natal off the South African coast, and is common in 14-18m of water, although it is found down to at least 30m. It is endemic to this area.

Ecology
Research at Rhodes University has shown that chemicals in this soft coral may have anti-inflammatory properties.

References

Parasphaerascleridae
Animals described in 1906